Marcel Vincent,  (December 4, 1907 – October 1, 1992) was a Canadian businessman. He was the first French Canadian president of Bell Canada from August 1, 1963, to August 1, 1968. He was chairman and CEO from August 1, 1968, to December 31, 1972.

Born in Montreal, Quebec, Vincent graduated from the Université de Montréal (HEC Montréal) with a master's degree in commerce. He joined Bell Canada in 1927 and served in World War II in the navy from 1941 to 1945.

In 1972 he was made a Companion of the Order of Canada "for his contribution to the business community". The Association francophone pour le savoir (Acfas) Prix Marcel-Vincent is named in his honour.

References

1907 births
1992 deaths
Canadian chairpersons of corporations
Companions of the Order of Canada
People from Montreal
Université de Montréal alumni
People of Bell Canada
Canadian chief executives
French Quebecers